The 2016–17 Montenegrin Second League was the eleventh season since the establishment of the Montenegrin Second League. The season ran from 14 August 2016 to May 2017.

Format of competition
A total of 12 teams participate in this edition of the Second League. New members are FK Mornar Bar who was relegated from 2015–16 Montenegrin First League, and winners of Montenegrin Third League playoffs - FK Čelik Nikšić and FK Otrant-Olympic Ulcinj.

Teams

The following 12 clubs competed in this season.

League table

Results
The schedule consists of three rounds. During the first two rounds, each team played each other once home-and-away for a total of 22 games. The pairings of the third round were then set according to the standings after the first two rounds, giving every team a third game against each opponent for a total of 33 games per team.

First and second round

Third round

Promotion play-offs
The runners-up and third-placed team in this season's league, Rudar Pljevlja and Petrovac respectively, will each pair off against the eighth and ninth-placed teams from the 2016–17 Montenegrin First League in the relegation play-offs, to be played over two legs. The draw was made on 29 May 2017. The two winners will play in next season's top-flight.

Summary

Matches

Petrovac won 5–1 on aggregate.

Rudar won 3–1 on aggregate.

Top scorers

References

External links
Football Association of Montenegro - Official Site

Montenegrin Second League seasons
2016–17 in Montenegrin football
Montenegro